Christopher Aspin (born 1933) is an English author, historian, and a retired journalist. Among his published works are a biography of James Hargreaves, inventor of the spinning jenny, and The First Industrial Society: Social History of Lancashire, 1750–1850, a study of the social aspects of the industrial revolution. Aspin has had a lifelong interest in local history and the history of the Lancashire textile industry in particular.

Life and career 

Aspin has spent his life in Helmshore, a small mill-town immediately south of Haslingden, Rossendale. In his 2003 memoir Just A Few Words: A Helmshore Boyhood he describes a friendly, polite, thrifty and hard-working community "...one half of the village being church and Tory, the other half chapel and Liberal". He writes warmly of his childhood memories, and how his family, friends and relatives were closely integrated into the discipline of the textile mills that provided most of the population with employment.

Aspin attended Helmshore Council School and, after a period during the war when he was often seriously ill, he passed a scholarship examination and started at Haslingden Grammar School in 1944. At school his passion for cricket developed, and Haslingden Cricket Club's ground was just a short walk away. Here he was able to see the international professionals who played for the club as part of the Lancashire Cricket League, which gradually became an important part of his life. He has written on league cricket for Wisden for the past 40 years, and has acted as the Secretary of Haslingden Cricket Club for more than 40 years; he has a suite named after him at the club.

After school Aspin undertook National Service in the RAF and, on completing this, he formed Helmshore Local History Society with his friend Derek Pilkington. In 1949 Aspin started work as a journalist, including the Lancashire Telegraph. Most of his working life was spent at the Manchester Evening News where he wrote on business, finance and music. He also acted as local correspondent for The Times, The Guardian, and The Daily Telegraph. He retired from journalism in 1993, but has continued to research and write books. During the 1960s, with Derek Pilkington and others, he helped with the transition of Higher Mill, Helmshore, into its role as Higher Mill Textile Museum.

Writings 

Throughout his writing Aspin has returned over and over to the ways in which Haslingden and Helmshore have changed and developed over the last century. Both places grew enormously during the Industrial Revolution, and were famous for the production of woollen and cotton goods. Many of his books record the rise and fall of the mills, which once dominated the skyline; the move away from railways to motorways; and the overall changes of the last half century, in which time Haslingden and Helmshore have become large residential areas for people commuting to Manchester and other nearby towns. His The Water-Spinners, A New Look at the Early Cotton Trade, records his search for the sites of mills that used Sir Richard Arkwright's machines. The Golden Valley describes Rossendale's most important years. Aspin has also been concerned with the civic and spiritual life of the community, as well as with sports (especially cricket) and other pastimes. His second book was a history of Haslingden Cricket Club in the Victorian Era, which was reviewed by John Arlott in Wisden. Aspin also wrote the popular Shire Publications guides to both the woollen and the cotton industries.

Aspin's research in the 1970s on poverty in working-class Salford, Manchester and elsewhere in Lancashire led to the journalist Stanley Graham's writings on cholera and sanitation in the slums. Aspin has contributed articles on cotton pioneers James Hargreaves, James Thomson and John Bullough, to the Oxford Dictionary of National Biography.

At the age of 70 Aspin wrote, Just a Few Words: A Helmshore Boyhood, remembering 50 years of thoughts and feelings of living in Helmshore throughout the 30s and 40s. He has also authored, sometimes in partnership with another local historian, John Simpson, several books of historic photographs of the district. Since retiring Aspin has written over a thousand light verses, published by Royd Publications and Carnegie Scotforth.

As well as his writings on local and textile history and heritage, Aspin has written a number of short books for children and young people. During his later years he has also has written booklets of ghosts and hauntings (typically taking place within Rossendale), and is a member  of the Society for Psychical Research.

Bibliography 
Haslingden 1800 – 1900, 1962, Helmshore Local History Society (HLHS)
james Hargreaves & the Spinning Jenny, 1964, Helmshore Local History Society  
The Turners of Helmshore and Higher Mill, 1970, higher Mill Museum Trust
Gone Cricket Mad: The Haslingden Club in the Victorian Era, 1976, HLHS 
Mr. Pilling's Short Cut to China and Other Stories of Rossendale Enterprise, 1983, HLHS 
Surprising Rossendale, 1986, HLHS 
Dizzy Heights: Story of Lancashire's First Flying Men, 1988, HLHS 
Surprising Lancashire 1988, Royd 
Memories of Village Life, 1992 with John Simpson, HLHS 
Haslingden and District in Old Picture Postcards, 1992, Europese Bibliotheek 
The First Industrial Society: Social History of Lancashire 1750–1850, 1998, Carnegie 
Helmshore, 2000, with Derek Pilkington and John Simpson HLHS 
The Spirit of Haslingden, 2002 with John Simpson, Landmark 
Just a Few Words: A Helmshore Boyhood, 2003 
The Cotton Industry, 2003, Shire Library, Bloomsbury  
Smile Please, 2004, Tor Press 
The Spirit of Haslingden and Helmshore: The 20th Century in Photographs, 2004, Landmark 
How Now Brown Cow, 2005 
The Woollen Industry, 2006, Shire Library, Bloomsbury  
The War of the Roses, 2006, TOR Press 
Fabrics, Filth and Fairy Tents Angus Bethune Reach, Ed. Chris Aspin 2007, Royd 
What Happened to the Iceberg, 2007, Tor 
The Jingle Book: Nonsense Verse and a Diabolical Story, 2007, Royd 
A Cotton-Fibre Halo: Manchester and the Textile Districts in 1849, Angus Bethune Reach, Ed. Chris Aspin 2007, Royd 
A Load of New Rubbish, 2008, Royd 
The Fastest Man: Steeple Jack's Adventures in Lancashire, 2009, HLHS 
Albert, the Lion and the Monkey, 2009, Royd 
The Owl and the Pussy-cat: New Light on an Old Legend, 2010, Royd 
Haslingden and Helmshore Through Time, 2010, with John Simpson, Amberley 
The Unfortunate Philanthropists, 2010, HLHS  
The Pied Pipe Man of Haslingden, 2011, Royd 
The Decoy: How the Portuguese Learned to Spin Like Arkwright, 2012, HLHS 
The Stair Lift Olympics: A Farrago of Nonsense, 2012, Royd 
The Tuneful Foghorns: Light Verse for Lighthouse Keepers, 2012, Royd 
The Water-spinners: A New Look at the Early Cotton Trade, 2013, HLHS 
Treasure Island – the Sequel: and Other Ludicrous Lines, 2013, Royd 
Strange Stories from a Lancashire Village, 2014, HLHS  
More Flights of Fancy, 2014, Royd 
Out of This World – Cricket as You've Never Known it, 2015, Royd 
A Nosegay of Nonsense, 2015, Royd 
True Stories of Our Local Ghosts, 2015, HLHS 
Strange, but True: More Stories of Curious Encounters, 2016 
What the Butler Saw, 2016
Brush up Your Shakespeare, 2017 Carnegie Scotforth 
More Strange Encounters, 2018 
Nessie in Wonderland, 2018 
The Golden Valley: When Rossendale Led the World, 2018, Carnegie Pub. 
Just a Few Extras: A Few No-balls and Wides, 2018, Carnegie Scotforth
A Day at the Races, 2018 Carnegie Scotforth
Who Burnt The Cakes, 2019 Tor Press
The Road to Ruin, 2020 Tor Press
Lockdown Lyrics, 2020 Tor Press
Virus Verses, 2020 Tor Press
Strange Things Happen, 2021 Helmshore Local History Society 
A Lighter Look at Life, 2021 Tor Press

References

1933 births
21st-century English writers
21st-century English historians
English journalists
Living people